Ichil Barlas, also known Ichil Noyan (Mongol: Ичил Барлас, Persian: ایچیل بارلاس, ; died 13th century A.D.) was a Head of Barlas Confederation, advisor and minister of Chagatai Khan's, he was ruled a region named Transoxiana, the land based on Middle Asia, he was the son and successor of his father Qarachar who was the founder of Barlas confederation and governor of transoxiana (1227–1256), he was the paternal Great-Great-Grandfather of Timur the central Asian conquer, who founded the Timurid Empire, Ichil paternally direct descendent of Tumanay Khan, Khan of the Mongol Borjigin Confederation.
Barlas
13th-century Mongolian people

Biography 
He was mentioned as selected hereditary of Qarachar, who was a foundation of Barlas Confederation, and Governor of Transoxiana under Chagatai Khanate, minister advisor to Chagatai Khan. he was a son of Qarachar who was a Borjigin prince, grandson of Suqu Sechen who was a close advisor of Genghis Khan, Ichil was a brother of Yesunte Möngke the another son of Qarachar, he have two mentioned paternal uncle's one named Qubilai Barlas (1150s–1211) who was one of four companions of Genghis Khan, other one Tuqachar Barlas (d. 1221) the son-in-law of Genghis Khan who was killed with arrow during Siege of Nishapur. Ichil was majorly referred as ancestor of Timur the founder of Timurid Empire, he was genealogically paternal Great-Great-Grandfather of Timur, Ichil was the leader of Barlas and served the military and ministership to the Chagatai Khans, he was died around 13th century CE. he was succeeded by his son Aylangir.

Family
Ichil Barlas had two sons one was his. confederacy successor Aylangir Barlas who was a Timur ancestor, other was Qutlug Qiya Barlas.

See also
Borjigin
Khamag Mongol
Mongol Empire
Chagatai Khanate
Timurid Dynasty

References